Fang Shuo (born September 7, 1990) is a Chinese basketball player who plays in the Point guard position for China and currently plays for Chinese club Beijing Ducks. He was included in the Chinese squad for the 2019 FIBA Basketball World Cup.

References

External links
FIBA profile
Profile at Eurobasket.com
Profile at RealGM
Profile at Proballers
Profile at basketball-reference.com
Profile at Global Sports Archive

1990 births
Living people
Chinese men's basketball players
Point guards
Asian Games gold medalists for China
Basketball players at the 2018 Asian Games
Asian Games medalists in basketball
2019 FIBA Basketball World Cup players
Beijing Ducks players
Basketball players from Beijing
Medalists at the 2018 Asian Games